KVSC 88.1 FM in Saint Cloud, Minnesota is part of Minnesota's Independent Public Radio network.  It is operated by St. Cloud State University and broadcasts a freeform radio format.  KVSC-FM is a non-commercial educational public broadcasting radio station that is a student-run college radio station and operates 365 days per year, nearly 24 hours a day.

Coverage
KVSC-FM has a power of 16,500 watts with a listening radius of about 70 miles. The station's frequency is 88.1 MHz, "farthest left on your FM dial." Its transmitter is located near Highway 15 and Interstate 94 south of St. Cloud proper. KVSC also broadcasts to the Minneapolis-St.Paul area via 89.9-HD3.

Programming
KVSC offers a blend of progressive rock, jazz, folk, reggae, world, blues, Minnesota music, and much more. KVSC has a wide variety of news programming which includes coverage of university, local & statewide events, and live broadcasts of St. Cloud State University sporting events.
The station carries an HD-subchannel, KVSC 88.1-2 that rebroadcasts sister station Radio X. It also has another subchannel, 88.1-4 that carries talk programming.

History
KVSC first began operations as a 10-watt, Class D broadcast facility on May 10, 1967, broadcasting at 88.5 megahertz. For ten years prior to this, students interested in radio broadcasting had no live-air broadcasting opportunities. The students would pre-produce all their programming in the university studios, which would then be aired on WJON (AM1240) radio. This meant that all programs produced would have to fit in with WJON's format or they would not get on the air. It was soon decided that St. Cloud State University had a need for its own radio broadcast facility, and thus KVSC was developed.

The call letters were selected to signify that the station would serve as the Voice of Saint Cloud. The station was run exclusively by volunteers from the University student population and was financed by the student activity fees and the Mass Communications department. The music format was predominantly classical music, with a smaller percentage of folk and rock music sprinkled in. The overall operation was small and required minimal funding, outside of the need for equipment acquisition and repair.

In 1969, the Higher Education Coordination Board formed a subcommittee to organize and work with communications programs in Minnesota higher-education institutions. KVSC's adviser was instrumental in developing this committee. In 1972, the HECB subcommittee was disbanded in favor of a new organization. The Association of Minnesota Public and Educational Radio Stations (AMPERS), a non-profit corporation, was officially registered on July 26, 1977. It comprised the same member stations which had been involved in the HECB committee. KVSC is a charter member of AMPERS and two of its managers have served terms as president.

On numerous occasions throughout the 1970s, KVSC sought approval to increase its broadcast power, with the final approval coming in November 1981. KVSC officially moved down the dial to 88.1 MHz at 6 a.m. on February 8, 1983, and increased power to 5,200 watts. KVSC was amended to a radio class C2 operation, and licensed to operate 20 hours per day. Unfortunately, broadcast at this new level caused interference with local television reception. Experimentation with antennae filters and transmitter dampers did little to alleviate the interference problems. In early April 1983, just over one month after the long-awaited increase, St. Cloud State University voluntarily elected to reduce KVSC's output power to 1,300 watts until a more permanent solution to this interference could be found.

Funding and permits were granted, allowing KVSC to erect a new antenna, away from the campus area (formerly located on top of Sherburne Hall).

The new transmitter site was built near the intersection of Highway 15 and Interstate-94, where high-power broadcasts would be less likely to interfere with the St. Cloud residents. The power increase was finalized on September 24, 1992. KVSC now broadcasts with an operating power of 16,500 watts, covering a 70-mile broadcast radius with a potential audience of nearly two million listeners in the central Minnesota region.

In November 1993 KVSC's sports department adopted the policy of not broadcasting Indian team mascot names in stories and within KVSC play-by-play coverage. This policy was put in place to recognize and respect Native Americans and Indigenous people's perspective on team mascot names.

KVSC began broadcasting 24 hours a day in September 1994. The license allows for unlimited broadcast hours, but KVSC maintains a 24-hour schedule except during semester and holiday breaks at the University. After several years of planning, KVSC began broadcasting its radio signal on the Internet in October 1999. (This Web site was established in 1995). KVSC established a solid relationship with Cloudnet, a local internet supplier. The station began with fifteen stereo Real Audio streams located at kvsc.org. There is now room for a great number of Internet listeners to enjoy KVSC's programming worldwide. With the introduction of KVSC on streaming audio, long-lost alumni, family and friends of the station can finally tune-in regardless of where in the world they may be.

KVSC's programming format has not always featured alternative and progressive music. For a brief period, starting in June 1984, student directors elected to change KVSC to a Top 40 "hit radio" format. During this period, KVSC lost its unique listener appeal. The programming was similar to most other Top 40 formats, and the program quality was considered poor. In the spring of 1985, university administration made the decision to override the student directors' decision and change KVSC's format back to the alternative and progressive format for which it is best known.

During the summer of 1986, the university administration approved the institution of KVSC's first full-time paid staff position. Kevin Ridley (known as Captain Science on the air) was a graduate of the Mass Communications program and long-time KVSC staff member. He took on the position of Station Manager, acting as a full-time liaison between the university administration and the KVSC staff and student directors. The position of Station Manager is currently held by Jo McMullen, also a graduate of the Mass Communications program at SCSU. KVSC also has two graduate student positions appointed annually to assist with station operations.

In May 2007 KVSC celebrated 40 Years of Broadcasting. With the presence of alumni from 1967 to present, volunteers (and those from the guild prior to the F.C.C. license issued on May 10, 1967) were there to celebrate. KVSC celebrated with four events - representing four decades of non-commercial, educational radio. More than 800 people enjoyed two concerts, social time and a backyard barbecue. 
KVSC operates 24 hours a day, 365 days a year. In its role as Your Sound Alternative (an official slogan since 1983), KVSC provides programming which is unique within its market. KVSC has received acclaim for outstanding efforts in the areas of public affairs, programming, news and sports coverage, pre-produced features and live music coverage. Notable alumni include Jill Riley of 89.3 The Current, and City Pages music critic Rob Callahan. The station is embracing technology developments (Digital, Internet, etc.) and who knows what the future will hold for 88.1FM.

Trivia Weekend
KVSC is well known in central Minnesota for its annual 50-hour trivia marathon.  The first "Trivia Weekend" took place in 1980, with 25 participating teams. In 2007, 80 teams participated, setting an all-time record.  The contest begins at 5 p.m. on the second Friday in February, and ends at 7 p.m. on the following Sunday.  During each of the 50 intervening hours, DJs read nine or more trivia questions over the air.  Teams are to call in with the correct answer before the time limit on the question expires. Question values have ranged from 10 to 500 points (in the 2008 and 2009 contests, instead of a single 500-point question for which teams had two hours, four 250-point questions were asked, one at the top of each of the last four hours), and any team that answers a question correctly in the allotted time (generally ranging from 5 to 30 minutes) is awarded the value of that question.  The team with the most points at the end of the contest wins, and is the owner for a year of the chipped vase known as The Minnesota Masters of Trivia Traveling Trophy.  The contest is staffed by volunteers and sponsored by local businesses.

References

External links
KVSC Official Web Site
Facebook Fan Page
Official Twitter Page
Official Myspace Page

Trivia 2008 Final Scores
KVSC Trivia Theme History
Radiotapes.com featuring an aircheck of 1st Trivia Weekend (1980) - Announcement of winners.

Radio stations in St. Cloud, Minnesota
Independent Public Radio
Radio stations established in 1967
St. Cloud State University
1967 establishments in Minnesota
College radio stations in Minnesota